Sekizuka (written: 関塚) is a Japanese surname. Notable people with the surname include:

, Japanese alpine skier
, Japanese footballer and manager

Japanese-language surnames